A list of films produced by the Israeli film industry released in 2013.

Announced and unscheduled releases

See also
2013 in Israel

References

External links
 Israeli films of 2013 at the Internet Movie Database

Israeli
Film
2013